Andrea Berg (born January 24, 1981) is a volleyball player from Germany, who was a member of the German Women's Team from 2001 to 2006.

She played as a middle-blocker. She participated at the 2003 Women's European Volleyball Championship, and the 2005 FIVB Volleyball World Grand Prix.

References

External links 
http://www.wn.de/Sport/Lokalsport/USC-Muenster/2013/10/Volleyball-Abschiedsspiel-von-USC-Groesse-Andrea-Berg-Eine-einmalige-Geschichte
http://www.gettyimages.com/photos/andrea-berg-volleyball-player?excludenudity=true&sort=mostpopular&mediatype=photography&phrase=andrea%20berg%20volleyball%20player

1981 births
Living people
People from Nordhorn
German women's volleyball players
Sportspeople from Lower Saxony
21st-century German women
20th-century German women